Pickin' On is a series of rock and country tribute albums performed in a bluegrass style. The records are released by CMH Records.

The albums are recorded by bluegrass studio musicians for example Dennis Caplinger playing all instruments on ten tracks on the Pickin' On Lee Ann Rimes album.

Discography

References

External links
Official Website
Pickin' On Series on Facebook
Pickin' On Series on Twitter
Pickin' On Series on YouTube

 
Country music discographies
Rock music discographies